Mike Wooldridge OBE is a world affairs correspondent for the BBC News. Wooldridge spent his youth at Bournemouth School before joining BBC News in April 1970 as a sub-editor. He became a news reporter in 1978, and in 1982 he became the East Africa correspondent. In 1989 he moved to Johannesburg to become the BBC's South Africa correspondent. Less than two years later in 1990 he became Religious Affairs correspondent, reporting on the influence of religion in modern societies, focusing on conflict arising from religion. In 1996 he moved to Delhi to become the South Asia correspondent. In 2001 Wooldridge became a world affairs correspondent for the BBC News.

During his time at the BBC, Wooldridge has covered many historic events, including:
1972, United Nations General Assembly
1975, General Franco's death.
1978, Earthquake in Tabas, Iran, in which more than 20,000 died.
1980's, African civil wars in refugee crises in Sudan, Somalia, Angola and Mozambique.
1985, Drought in Ethiopia
1990, release from prison of Nelson Mandela.
1997, 50th Anniversary of Independence between India and Pakistan.
1999, Kargil District conflict in India's Kashmir region.

In the Queen's 2002 Birthday Honours he received an OBE for "services to broadcasting in developing countries".

References

Living people
BBC newsreaders and journalists
Officers of the Order of the British Empire
Year of birth missing (living people)